Ashland Middle School is a middle school in Ashland, Wisconsin's Ashland School District.  It is also the name of a former school building that was listed on the U.S. National Register of Historic Places from 1980 until it was delisted in 2009.

The former school building was built in 1904 and was noted for its architecture, which contained Late Victorian, nineteenth-century revival and twentieth-century revival styles.  The building was designed by Henry Wildhagen, who also designed three other schools in Ashland, all surviving, which also are NRHP-listed: Beaser School (1899), Ellis School (1900), and Wilmarth School (1895).

The current school building also hosts the Oredocker Project School, a charter school with a focus on students learning through completing comprehensive projects.

Notes

References  

Buildings and structures in Ashland County, Wisconsin
Former National Register of Historic Places in Wisconsin
National Register of Historic Places in Ashland County, Wisconsin
Ashland, Wisconsin